Herriottsville is an unincorporated community in South Fayette Township, Allegheny County, Pennsylvania, United States. The community is located in the southeast corner of the township near Chartiers Run. Herriottsville had one of the first post offices in South Fayette Township and was a stagecoach stop on the Black Horse Trail.

Notable people
John Herriott, Lieutenant Governor of Iowa

References

Unincorporated communities in Allegheny County, Pennsylvania
Unincorporated communities in Pennsylvania